Henry Frick (March 17, 1795 – March 1, 1844) was a Whig member of the U.S. House of Representatives from Pennsylvania.

Biography
Henry Frick was born in Northumberland, Pennsylvania.  He attended public schools and apprenticed to a printer in Philadelphia.  He served in the War of 1812.  He settled in Milton, Pennsylvania, in 1816, and established the Miltonian, a political journal, with which he was connected for over twenty years.  He was a member of the Pennsylvania House of Representatives from 1828 to 1831.

Frick was elected as a Whig to the Twenty-eighth Congress and served until his death in Washington, D.C., in 1844.  Interment in the Congressional Cemetery.

See also
List of United States Congress members who died in office (1790–1899)

Sources

The Political Graveyard

1795 births
1850 deaths
Members of the Pennsylvania House of Representatives
Burials at the Congressional Cemetery
Whig Party members of the United States House of Representatives from Pennsylvania
19th-century American politicians